The Old Homestead is a 1935 American romantic western musical film directed by William Nigh.

Cast
Mary Carlisle ...  Nancy Abbott
Lawrence Gray ...  Bob Shackleforth
Willard Robertson ...  Uncle Jed
Dorothy Lee ...  Elsie Wilson
Edward J. Nugent ...  Rudy Nash (as Eddie Nugent)
Lillian Miles ...  Peggy
Fuzzy Knight ...  Lem
Eddie Kane ...  Mr. Wertheimer
Harry Conley ...  J. Wilberforce Platt, Press Agent
Tim Spencer ...  Vern, Member of Sons of the Pioneers (as Vern Spencer)
Bob Nolan ...  Bob, Member of Sons of the Pioneers
Roy Rogers ...  Len, Member of Sons of the Pioneers
Hugh Farr ...  Hugh, Member of Sons of the Pioneers
Sally Sweet ...  Singer

External links 
 

1935 films
1930s romantic musical films
American Western (genre) musical films
American black-and-white films
American romantic musical films
Films directed by William Nigh
1930s English-language films
1930s American films